Chongji may be 
McCune–Reischauer Romanization of the pen name of Joseon Dynasty aristocrat Jeong Do-jeon
McCune–Reischauer Romanization of Jongji-ri, village in Hansan-myeon, Seocheon-gun, Chungcheongnam-do
Revised Romanization of the pen name of Unified Silla period Confucian scholar Seol Chong